Novaya is a rural locality (a village) in Andreyevskoye Rural Settlement, Sudogodsky District, Vladimir Oblast, Russia. The population was 249 as of 2010. There are 4 streets.

Geography 
Novaya is located 25 km southeast of Sudogda (the district's administrative centre) by road. Mostishchi is the nearest rural locality.

References 

Rural localities in Sudogodsky District